The Australia–Indonesia border is a maritime boundary running west from the two countries' tripoint maritime boundary with Papua New Guinea in the western entrance to the Torres Straits, through the Arafura Sea and Timor Sea, and terminating in the Indian Ocean. The boundary is, however, broken by the Timor Gap, where Australian and East Timorese territorial waters meet and where the two countries have overlapping claims to the seabed.

Australia and Indonesia also share a common maritime border in the Indian Ocean between Australia's overseas territory of Christmas Island and the Indonesian island of Java.

A characteristic of the maritime border between the two countries is the separation of the ownership of the seabed (essentially the continental shelf) and ownership of the water column (exclusive economic zone), each with its own boundary. Ownership of the seabed gives the country rights over all mineral resources in the seabed while ownership of the water column allows a country fishing rights and rights to other resources of the water in the specified area. The 1997 treaty establishing this and the western parts of the border, as well as that between Christmas Island and Java, has however not been ratified and is not in force. This was because the independence of East Timor required amendments to the 1997 treaty and agreement over them by the two parties is still pending.

The border
The boundary is separated into three segments, with the first two broken by the Timor Gap. The third is between the Australian external territory of Christmas Island and the Indonesia island of Java, in the Indian Ocean.

The boundary is established by four treaties, the fourth of which has been signed but not yet ratified. The Agreement between the Government of the Commonwealth of Australia and the Government of the Republic of Indonesia establishing Certain Seabed Boundaries signed in Canberra on 18 May 1971 established part of the eastern segment of the seabed boundary (as well as Indonesia's maritime boundary with Papua New Guinea in the Torres Straits) while the Agreement between the Government of the Commonwealth of Australia and the Government of the Republic of Indonesia establishing certain seabed boundaries in the area of the Timor and Arafura Seas, Supplementary to the Agreement of 18 May 1971 which was signed in Jakarta on 9 October 1972 demarcated the rest of the eastern segment and a portion of the western segment of the seabed boundary. A third agreement, Agreement between Australia and Indonesia concerning Certain Boundaries between Papua New Guinea and Indonesia established the demarcation between the soon to be independent Papua New Guinea and Indonesia was signed in Jakarta on 12 February 1973.  A fourth treaty, the Treaty between the Government of Australia and the Government of the Republic of Indonesia establishing an Exclusive Economic Zone Boundary and Certain Seabed Boundaries (informally known as the Australia–Indonesia Maritime Delimitation Treaty) which was signed in Perth on 14 March 1997 (however not ratified), proposes to extended the western segment of the seabed boundary to its termination point in the Indian Ocean.

The basis for establishing the boundary in the 1971 and 1972 treaties was that of the "natural prolongation" of the physical continental shelf. This resulted in the boundary running significantly north of the median line between the shores of Australia and Indonesia, thus benefiting Australia in terms of the division of the seabed ownership. The International Law view of settling overlapping claims has then moved towards the median-line concept, although Australia still holds the view that natural prolongation was still relevant to determine the sovereignty of the seabed. This resulted in the separate treatment of establishing the seabed boundary and that for the water column, or essentially, the separation of the continental shelf and exclusive economic zone boundaries under the 1997 treaty.

The independence of East Timor on 20 May 2002 may result in changes in the Australia–Indonesia border near the Timor Gap which were established by the three treaties. Provisions of the 1997 treaty on matters concerning the Timor Gap – such as reaffirming the Timor Gap Treaty between Australia and Indonesia and the drawing of the water column boundary through the area of joint development – would no longer be applicable with East Timor becoming the rightful claimant of the seabed and exclusive economic zone in the area. Furthermore, the "Timor Gap terminal points" established by the 1972 treaty, namely Points A16 and A17, might have to be renegotiated by Australia, East Timor and Indonesia, as East Timor might have the basis to seek a "wider" Timor Gap than originally provided by Australia and Indonesia.

Seabed (continental shelf) boundary

Eastern segment
The eastern segment of the boundary was established by both the 1971 and 1972 treaties, the former delimiting the border from A3 to A12 and the latter extending it from A12 to A16, which lies on the eastern border of the Australia – East Timor joint petroleum development area. Points A1, A2 and A3 form part of the Indonesia – Papua New Guinea border which was also established under the 1971 treaty when Papua New Guinea was still an Australian territory.

Western segment
The 1972 treaty brought the boundary to Point A25 to the north-east of Australia's Ashmore Island. The 1997 treaty extended it further west, terminating at A82 in the Indian Ocean where Australia's and Indonesia's exclusive economic zone limits diverge.

Christmas Island/Java segment
The maritime boundary between the island and Indonesia which was established by the 1997 treaty is a modified median line which lies closer to the island by virtue of it being an isolated island lying next to the coastline of a larger country. The boundary generally runs east–west and terminates both ends where the boundary of the Australian exclusive economic zone created around Christmas Island diverges from the Indonesian EEZ. Unlike the boundary in the Arafura and Timor Seas, there are no separate boundaries for the seabed and water column.

Water column (exclusive economic zone) boundary
A separate "water column boundary", essentially an exclusive economic zone boundary for the ownership of fishery resources, was created under the 1997 treaty. It runs to the south of the Australia-Indonesia seabed boundary and terminates in the Indian Ocean where the Australian and Indonesia EEZ diverge. The boundary essentially follows the Provisional Fisheries Surveillance and Enforcement Line (PFSEL), a non-treaty status agreement made in 1981 between the two countries, and is generally based on the median line principle measures from the Australian mainland and Indonesian archipelagic baseline.

The 1997 treaty essentially separates the sovereignty of the seabed and water column in the area between the water column boundary and the seabed boundary, whereby Australia has sovereignty over the seabed and its resources, while Indonesia has sovereignty over the water column and the resources which live in it.

Although the 1997 treaty did not "close" the Timor Gap by establishing the seabed boundary in the area, it however established the water column boundary, which virtually corresponded with the boundary between Zone A and Zone B under the Timor Gap Treaty. With the independence of East Timor, this stretch of the water column boundary between Point Z28 and Point Z36 was no longer applicable. The stretch is now replaced with a "water column jurisdiction" line drawn by the Treaty on Certain Maritime Arrangements in the Timor Sea between Australia and East Timor signed on 12 January 2006 which corresponds with the southern border of the Australia-East Timor Joint Petroleum Development Area (JPDA), with Australia having control over the water column south of the line, and East Timor to the north including over the entire JPDA.

History

Indonesia had a land border with Australia before Papua New Guinea gained independence in 1975. It follows the 141st meridian.

Disputes
With the signing of the 1997 Australia–Indonesia Maritime Delimitation Treaty, most grey areas between the two countries, whose relations have at various stages ranged from cordial to downright hostile, concerning their common maritime boundary could be deemed to have been settled. This includes not only the question of sovereignty over the seabed but also the ownership of resources inhabiting the water column above the seabed. The earlier dispute over the sovereignty of the seabed in the area known as the Timor Gap also ended with the secession and independence of East Timor.

The following were areas of disputes in the historical context.

Boundary delimitation principle

The first two treaties to establish the seabed boundary between Australia and Indonesia utilised the "natural prolongation of the continental shelf" principle. Especially for the second treaty, Australia argued that the deep Timor Trough was the natural edge of its continental shelf. The resulting boundary was therefore located closer to Indonesia and had potentially denied considerable share of petroleum resources from the seabed.

Despite the principle being agreed to via negotiations, its use had been a constant point of discontent on the part of the Indonesians, with its former Foreign Minister Mochtar Kusumaatmadja saying that the country had been "taken to the cleaners" by Australia. With the 1982 United Nations Convention on the Law of the Sea, Indonesia argued that the median line – the equidistant line from the baselines of both countries – was the correct location of the boundary. The growing strength of Indonesia's argument over Australia's natural prolongation principle had a significant bearing on the subsequent treaties between the two countries, namely the Timor Gap Treaty of 1989 and the 1997 Australia–Indonesia Maritime Delimitation Treaty.

The differing principles on where the boundary was to be located resulted in the inability to reach agreement to close the Timor Gap with a permanent maritime boundary. A resources sharing joint development area arrangement instead had to be agreed to. Further details on this in the following section.

The 1997 treaty saw Australia's natural prolongation argument prevail as far as the seabed (essentially the continental shelf) claim is concerned. However, Indonesia's median line argument was accepted for establishing its rights over the water column or exclusive economic zone, resulting in the separation of the two types of boundaries. The treaty recognises Indonesia's full ownership of living resources in the water north of the water column boundary and south of the seabed boundary. The water column boundary, essentially the median line, has in fact been a de facto EEZ boundary since such a line was established by the Provisional Fisheries Surveillance and Enforcement Line (PFSEL) which was agreed to in 1981.

Timor Gap

Australia and Indonesia were engaged in negotiations to solve a dispute over overlapping claims to the continental shelf in the Timor Gap when East Timor was annexed and became part of Indonesian territory in 1975. After the two earlier seabed boundary treaties, Indonesia was determined that the seabed boundary that would close the Timor Gap would lie along the median line between the two countries.

Talks began in 1979 but there was no agreement over the permanent maritime boundary. Instead, the two countries settled for a "sovereignty neutral" agreement in 1989 which allowed joint exploitation and equal sharing of petroleum resources in a "zone of cooperation" which lay in between the extremes of the claims by the two countries.

The 1989 treaty was no longer valid once East Timor seceded from Indonesia in 1999, and the new state was not bound by the treaty. Indonesia had also informed Australia later that year that it was no longer bound by the Timor Gap Treaty.

The dispute over the Timor Gap now is between Australia and East Timor and does not involve Indonesia. However, Indonesia may have to become a party in negotiations to establish the Australia-East Timor-Indonesia border tripoints if East Timor chooses not to be bound by the current "width" of the Timor Gap decided by Australia and Indonesia (through the 1972 treaty) without consultation with the East Timorese, or with Portugal, the colonial administrator of East Timor at the time.

See also
Australia–Indonesia relations
MOU Box
Timor Sea Treaty

References

 
Borders of Australia
Borders of Indonesia